The southern coast of Chile presents a large number of fjords and fjord-like channels from the latitudes of Cape Horn (55° S) to Reloncaví Estuary (42° S). Some fjords and channels are important navigable channels providing access to ports like Punta Arenas, Puerto Chacabuco and Puerto Natales.

It is very rare for the fjords to freeze in winter but when it happens it is usually in the inner parts of fjords whose surface waters are mainly freshwater.

History

Indigenous peoples
The earliest known inhabitants of the fjords and channels were, from north to south, the Chono, Alacalufe and Yaghan, all of whom shared a life style as canoe-faring hunter-gatherers. They also shared physical traits such as being of low stature, long-headed (Dolichocephalic), and having a "low face". Despite similarities their languages were completely different. The Chono moved around in the area from Chiloé Archipelago to 50° S and the Alacalufe from 46° S to the Strait of Magellan. Thus both groups overlapped in Gulf of Penas, Guayaneco Archipelago and other islands. Yaghans inhabited a reduced area south of Tierra del Fuego.

It is often assumed that Chonos were the people who left behind most of the abundant Pre-Historic shell middens (chonchales) of Chiloé Archipelago, yet this claim is unverified. Guaitecas Archipelago made up the southern limit of Pre-Hispanic agriculture as noted by the mention of the cultivation of potatoes by a Spanish expedition in 1557.

Both Chonos and Alacalufes used Pilgerodendron uviferum as firewood as well as wood for rows, boats and houses.

Colonial expeditions and decline of the Chono
Pedro de Valdivia sought originally to conquer all of southern South America to the Straits of Magellan (53° S). He did however only reach Reloncaví Sound (41°45' S). Later in 1567 Chiloé Archipelago (42°30' S) was conquered, from there on southern expansion of the Spanish Empire halted. The Spanish are thought to have lacked incentives for further conquests south. The indigenous populations were scarce and had ways of life that differed from the sedentary agricultural life the Spanish were accustomed to. The harsh climate in the fjords and channels of Patagonia may also have deterred further expansion. Indeed, even in Chiloé did the Spanish encounter difficulties to adapt as their attempts to base the economy on gold extraction and a "hispanic-mediterranean" agricultural model failed.

During colonial times, the fjords and channels of Patagonia were first explored by the Spaniards. There were a number of motivations for their explorations, including a desire to Christianize indigenous peoples, to prevent intrusions of foreign powers into territory claimed by Spain, to increase geographic knowledge of the zone, and finally, to search for a mythical city called City of the Caesars. False rumors of European settlements near the Straits of Magellan led the Spanish to organize the Antonio de Vea expedition of 1675–1676, the largest expedition to the date. In 1792, the viceroy of Peru ordered the exploration of the Patagonian channels in order to find an entrance to the interior of Patagonia. The said order was carried of by José de Moraleda who led an expedition that visited many of the main channels of the zone.

Following the decline of the Chono populations in the archipelago in the 18th century, the area gained a reputation of "emptiness" among Chileans akin to the description of eastern Patagonia as a "desert."  However, the islands were often visited and traversed in the 19th century by fishermen, lumberjacks, and hunters from Chiloé. This makes it clear that many areas that were traversed by explorers were already known to the inhabitants of southern Chiloé who visited these areas for wood, fish or hunting.

Over-all the physical infrastructure of the Spanish in the fjords and channels during the colonial period was negligible and consisted of a few chapels built in the 1610s and 1620s and a wooden fortress built in 1750. All these buildings were abandoned after a few years.

19th century: Explorations and first settlements

Chilean and European exploration

In the early to mid 19th century, explorations by hydrographers like Robert FitzRoy and Francisco Hudson increased knowledge on the channels. With Hudson's death in 1859 Francisco Vidal Gormaz continued the explorations, a duty that Enrique Simpson assumed in the 1870s. The channels south of the Isthmus of Ofqui were explored in detail by Chilean government agent Hans Steffen in the late 19th century.

During his explorations and charting in the second half of the 19th century Vidal Gormaz became critical of the work of Robert FitzRoy and Charles Darwin whom according to him had failed acknowledge the importance of the Patagonian islands.

Pilgerodendron boom
Felipe Westhoff, a German-Lithuanian immigrant who operated a Pilgerodendron uviferum logging business from Ancud, founded Melinka in Guaitecas Archipelago in 1860. This was the first permanent settlement in the archipelago. Chilean authorities granted Westhoff exclusive rights on Pilgerodendron extraction in the archipelago and bestowed him the title of subdelegado marítimo which gave him some duties and authority over the archipelago, in reality it meant little since he did no had the means to enforce the law or his rights. After Westhoff's retirement in the 1870s Ciriaco Álvarez rose to prominence as the foremost Pilgerodendron businessman. The chief export products of Álvarez were poles and vine training stacks that went to northern Chile and Peru. Álvarez business owned him the nickname of  "The King of Pilgerodendron" and had great effects on the incipient economic development that came to link the archipelagoes of Chiloé, Guaitecas and Chonos.

Climate and geography
This route is mostly used by vessels desiring to avoid the heavy seas and bad weather so often experienced on passing into the Pacific Ocean from the western end of the Strait of Magellan. The large full-powered mail steamers generally at once gain the open sea at Cape Pillar (at the west entrance of the Strait of Magellan), as experience has shown that time is thus saved to them; but vessels of less engine power, to which punctuality and dispatch is not so much an object as avoiding possible danger, will find the Patagonian Channels the best route.

The general features of these channels are high, abrupt shores, with innumerable peaks and headlands remarkably alike in character, their bold, rugged heads giving an appearance of gloomy grandeur rarely seen elsewhere. The shores are generally steep-to and the channels, for the most part, open and free, while the few dangers that exist are usually marked by kelp. The tides are regular and not strong, except in the English Narrows.

In the case of the two above mentioned and some other fjords, these waterways proved of value as transport lanes when western Patagonia was settled and incorporated into Chile. On the other hand, the fjords have served as a natural barrier preventing north-south land travel in Chilean Patagonia.

Legal status of the waterways

All waters between the Chilean baselines and the continental shoreline are internal waters, according to the Chilean decree 416 of 14 June 1977 based in the United Nations Convention on the Law of the Sea, that is, the coastal nation is free to set laws, regulate any use, and use any resource. Foreign vessels have no right of passage within internal waters, and this lack of right to innocent passage is the key difference between internal waters and territorial waters. Chile allows the use of the main waterways under maritime authority dispositions for the following navigation lanes (all names in Spanish):

a) throughout the Strait of Magellan:

Punta Dúngenes - Primera Angostura - Segunda Angostura, Paso Nuevo -Paso Inglés - Paso Tortuoso - Paso Largo - Paso del Mar - Cabo Pilar (and back).

b) from Cabo Tamar to isla San Pedro :

Cabo Tamar - Canal Smyth - Canal Mayne or Canal Gray - Paso Victoria - Estrecho Collingwood - Paso Farquhar - Canal Sarmiento - Angostura Guías - Canal Inocentes - Canal Concepción - Paso Caffin - Canal Trinidad - either Pacific Ocean, (and back) or to continue Canal Wide - either (east route) Canal Icy - Canal Grappler or (west route) Canal Escape - Paso del Abismo or Paso Piloto Pardo - Canal Escape; then Paso del Indio - Angostura Inglesa - Canal Messier to Isla San Pedro, (and back) or from Cabo Ladrillero to Canal Concepción to inner channels (and back)

c) From Strait of Magellan to Puerto Natales or Puerto Bories:

from Isla Brinkley - Seno Unión - Canal Morla Vicuña - Canal y angostura Kirke - Canal Valdés, Golfo Almirante Montt - Canal Señoret - Seno Última Esperanza - Puerto Natales - Puerto Bories (and back)

d) from Strait of Magellan to Puerto Williams:

from islote Anxious - Canal Magdalena - Canal Cockburn - Paso Brecknock or Canal Ocasión - Canal Unión - Paso Occidental - Paso Norte - Canal Ballenero- Canal O'Brien - Paso Timbales - Brazo noroeste del Canal Beagle - Canal Beagle - Puerto Williams (and back).(Chilean ships can use Paso Aguirre)

e) from Puerto Williams to Cabo de Hornos:

Canal Beagle - Paso Picton - Paso Richmond - to Cabo de Hornos (and back)

f) to the east Beagle Channel:

Ships coming from east can access through the eastern mouth, northeast of Isla Nueva or through the Pasos Richmond and Picton.

g) to Seno Otway and Seno Skyring:

from Isla Carlos III - Canal Jerónimo - Seno Otway - Canal Fitz-Roy - Seno Skyring to Bahía Mina Elena (and back).

h) to Isla Guarello:

from Isla Inocentes - Canal Concepción - Canal Oeste - Seno Contreras - Bahía Corbeta Papudo in Isla Guarello, (and back), or from Bahía Corbeta Papudo in Isla Guarello - Seno Contreras - Paso Metalero (and back).

i) throughout Chonos Archipelago:

from isla Inchemó - Bahía Anna Pink - Boca Wickham - Canal Pulluche - Canal Chacabuco - Canal Errázuriz - Canal Moraleda until Gulf of Corcovado and Boca del Guafo (and back) or
from isla Inchemó - Bahía Anna Pink - Boca Wickham - Canal Pulluche - Canal Utarupa - Canal Darwin -Canal Moraleda to Gulf of Corcovado and Boca del Guafo (and back) or
from isla Auchilú, - Bahía Darwin - Canal Darwin - Canal Moraleda to Gulf of Corcovado and Boca del Guafo (and back) or
from Bahía Adventure - Isla Liebre - Canal Niñualac - Canal Moraleda to Gulf of Corcovado and Boca del Guafo (and back).

j) to bahía Chacabuco:

from Canal Moraleda - Paso del Medio or Canal Pilcomayo or Canal Ferronave - Seno Aysén to Bahía Chacabuco (and back).

k) to Laguna San Rafael:

from Canal Moraleda - Paso Casma - Canal Costa - Estero Elefante - Paso Quesahuén - Golfo Elefantes and Río Témpanos - Laguna San Rafael (and back) or
from Canal Moraleda - Canal Errázuriz - Paso Tres Cruces - Estero Elefantes - Paso Quesahuén - Golfo Elefantes and Río Témpanos - Laguna San Rafael (and back).

l) through the inner channels of Chiloé:

from Boca del Guafo or Golfo Corcovado to Puerto Montt or to Golfo de Coronados, (and back) throughout the inner Channels heading to ports and bays

m) to Puerto Montt through Canal de Chacao:

from golfo Coronados - Canal de Chacao - Golfo de Ancud - Canal Calbuco or Paso Queullín - Seno de Reloncaví - Paso Guar - Puerto Montt (and back).

Transportation

Since it is impossible to reach all the region by road through Chile, the transport of persons and cargo must be done by ship or airplanes according to the public infrastructure provision.

Ferry lanes

In order to carry significant quantities of persons, vehicles, and cargo directly onto an unimproved shore to supply the islands and coastal region including settlements, the ferry is the best suited ship type and most of them are basically a cargo boat with no fancy, cruiser-type accommodation, even though they have managed to improve their customer service. There are 150 major ships sailing in the southern regions of Chile.

Cruise ships also operate between the main ports of the region and offer a journey that is considered an experience in itself, due to the slow way of entering this magnificent landscape of narrow channels and solitary islands.

With the exception of Chiloé Island, the region is sparsely inhabited. The main ports are: Puerto Montt, Quellón, Chaitén, Melinka, Puerto Chacabuco, Puyuguapi, Puerto Natales, Punta Arenas, Porvenir and Puerto Williams.

South of Chiloé, there are also small ports like Villa Puerto Edén, Bahía Corbeta Papudo on Guarello Island, Puerto Bories, Puerto Navarino, Puerto Toro, and Caleta Eugenia.

The Isthmus of Ofqui canal project

In order to open a direct passage from the Moraleda Channel to the Messier Channel without to go out into the open Pacific Ocean to round the Taitao Peninsula, the Chilean Government ordered in 1937 the construction of a canal from the San Rafael Lagoon through the isthmus (2,200 m long, 17 m wide, 5 m depth) to the Negro River, that later should be dredged . 1937 began the work on the ground, under the management of the railways department of the Ministry of Public Works. Work continued until May 1943 when funds ran out. The map on the right shows the Laguna San Rafael and the Golfo Elefantes, they are the southernmost part of the Moraleda Channel. The Golfo San Esteban can be seen as the northernmost part of the Messier Channel.

Chacao Channel bridge

The Chacao Channel bridge, also known as Chiloé Bicentennial Bridge, is a planned bridge that is to link the island of Chiloé with mainland Chile crossing the Chacao Channel. It was one of the several projects that were planned to commemorate the Chile's bicentennial in 2010. If completed as a suspension bridge, it would be the largest such bridge in South America.

Main fjords and channels

Chacao to Guafo

 Chacao Channel
Access to the Sea of Chiloé and Reloncaví Sound
Settlements: Chacao

 Calbuco Channel
Access to
Settlements:

 Comau Fjord
Access to
Settlements:

 Dalcahue Channel
Access to
Settlements:

 Hornopirén Channel
Access to Hornopirén area
Settlements: Hornopirén

 Piti Palena Fjord
Access to
Settlements: Raúl Marin

 Apiao Channel
Access to
Settlements:

 Paso Desertores
Access to
Settlements:

Reloncaví Estuary
Access to Puelo River, Todos los Santos Lake and Vuriloche Pass
Settlements: Canutillar, Cochamó

 Reñihué Fjord
Access to Carretera Austral
Settlements: Caleta Gonzalo

Guaitecas to the Gulf of Penas

 Aysén Fjord
Access to Coyhaique area
Settlements: Puerto Chacabuco

 Baker Channel
Access to Baker and Pascua River area
Settlements: Caleta Tortel

 Estero Capquelan
Access to
Settlements:

 Mitchell Fjord
Access to Villa O'Higgins and O'Higgins Lake
Settlements: Puerto Yungay

 Darwin Channel (not to be confused with Darwin Sound)
Access to
Settlements:

 Moraleda Channel
Access to northern Aysén Region
Settlements:

 Puyuhuapi Channel
Access to Villa La Tapera
Settlements: Puerto Cisnes

 Ventisquero Sound
Access to
Settlements:

Gulf of Penas to Straits of Magellan

 Messier Channel
 English Narrows
 Guía Narrows

Safe sea-lane from Central Chile to Punta Arenas, Puerto Natales and Tierra del Fuego
Settlements: Villa Puerto Edén

 Concepción Channel
Access to
Settlements:

 Wide Channel
Access to
Settlements:

 Inocentes Channel
Access to
Settlements:

 Sarmiento Channel
Safe sea-lane from Central Chile to Punta Arenas, Puerto Natales and Tierra del Fuego
Settlements:

 Señoret Channel
Access to
Settlements:

 Peel Fjord
Access to
Settlements:

Eyre Fjord
Access to
Settlements:

Fallos Channel
Access to
Settlements:

Trinidad Channel
Access to
Settlements:

Ladrillero Channel
Access to
Settlements:

Picton Channel
Access to
Settlements:

Covadonga Channel
Access to
Settlements:

Albatros Channel
Access to
Settlements:

Adalbert Channel
Access to
Settlements:

Esteban Channel
Access to
Settlements:

Tierra del Fuego and Puerto Natales

 Nelson Strait (Chile)
Access to
Settlements:

 Fjord of the Mountains
Access to
Settlements:

 Smyth Channel
Safe sea-lane from Central Chile to Punta Arenas, Puerto Natales and Tierra del Fuego
Settlements:

Seno Última Esperanza
Access to
Settlements:

Eberhard Fjord
Access to
Settlements:

 Agostini Fjord
Access to
Settlements:

 Almirantazgo Fjord
Access to Cami Lake in Tierra del Fuego
Settlements:

 Canal Whiteside
Access to
Settlements:

 Inútil Bay
Access to
Settlements:

 Seno Otway
Access to
Settlements:

 Seno Skyring
Access to
Settlements:

 Beagle Channel
Safe sea-lane between the South Atlantic and the South Pacific
Settlements: Puerto Navarino, Puerto Williams, Puerto Toro.

 Darwin Sound (not to be confused with Darwin Channel)
Access to Beagle Channel from the Pacific and the Strait of Magellan
Settlements:

 Abra Channel
 Access to the Strait of Magellan from Pacific Ocean
Settlements:

 Magdalena Channel
Access to the Strait of Magellan from Pacific Ocean
Settlements:

 Cockburn Channel
Access to the Strait of Magellan from Pacific Ocean, route from Beagle Channel to Strait of Magellan
Settlements:

 Ballenero Channel
Route from Beagle Channel to Strait of Magellan
Settlements:

 Strait of Magellan
 Punta Dúngenes
 Bahia Possession
 Primera Angostura
 Segunda Angostura
 Cape Froward
 Evangelistas Lighthouse
Safe sea-lane between the South Atlantic and the South Pacific
Settlements: Porvenir, Punta Arenas, Camerón

Murray Channel
Connects Beagle Channel with Cape Horn through Bahía Nassau
Puerto Navarino

 Pitt Channel
Access to
Settlements:

Gallery

See also

 Archipelagoes of Patagonia
 Geography of Chile
 Islands of Chile
 List of Antarctic and subantarctic islands
 List of fjords, channels, sounds and straits of Chile
 List of islands of Chile
 List of lighthouses and lightvessels in Chile

Notes

References

 
 
 
 
 United States Hydrographic Office, South America Pilot (1916)
 

 
Chile
Fjords
Straits of Chile
Temperate South America